Koronis (Greek  "curved") may refer to:

Koronis family, a family of asteroids
158 Koronis, an asteroid 
Koronis Pharmaceuticals
Koronis Rift, a 1985 computer game
Lake Koronis, a lake in Paynesville, Minnesota, U.S.
Operation Koronis
Coronis (diacritic) (Ancient Greek: koronis), a mark over vowel letters in Ancient Greek
Coronis (textual symbol) (Ancient Greek: koronis), a symbol in Ancient Greek papyri

See also
 Coronis (disambiguation)
 Coronus (disambiguation)
 Korinos, a town and a former municipality in Pieria regional unit, Greece
 Koronos, a village on the Greek island of Naxos
 Kronos (disambiguation)